Sternidius is a genus of flat-faced longhorns in the family of beetles known as Cerambycidae. There are at least 20 described species in Sternidius.

Species
These 20 species belong to the genus Sternidius:

 Sternidius alpha (Say, 1827) c g b
 Sternidius batesi (Gahan, 1892) c g
 Sternidius centralis (LeConte, 1884) c g b
 Sternidius chemsaki Lewis, 1977 c g
 Sternidius crassulus LeConte, 1873 c g
 Sternidius decorus (Fall, 1907) c g b
 Sternidius gracilipes (Linsley, 1942) c g
 Sternidius imitans (Knull, 1936) c g b
 Sternidius incognitus Lewis, 1977 c g
 Sternidius mimeticus (Casey, 1891) c g b
 Sternidius misellus (LeConte, 1852) c g b
 Sternidius naeviicornis (Bates, 1885) c g
 Sternidius nivosus (Linsley, 1942) c g
 Sternidius pantherinus Zayas, 1975 c g
 Sternidius punctatus (Haldeman, 1847) c g b
 Sternidius rosaliae (Linsley, 1942) c g
 Sternidius rossi (Linsley, 1942) c g
 Sternidius subfascianus (White, 1855) c g
 Sternidius variegatus (Haldeman, 1847) i
 Sternidius wiltii (Horn, 1880) c g b

Data sources: i = ITIS, c = Catalogue of Life, g = GBIF, b = Bugguide.net

References

Further reading

External links

 

Acanthocinini